The Torneo Campeones Olímpicos was a Uruguayan football tournament organized by the Uruguayan Football Association in 1974.

It was a qualifying tournament for the Liguilla Pre-Libertadores and granted four slots for it.

List of champions

Titles by club

1974 Torneo Campeones Olímpicos

Standings

References

H
Recurring sporting events established in 1974
1974 disestablishments in Uruguay